House at 313 North Main Street is a historic home located at Canastota in Madison County, New York.  It was built about 1840 and remodelled in the 1880s and features Greek Revival-style and Eastlake-style details.  It is an L-shaped frame dwelling composed of a 2-story main block and -story service wing.

It was added to the National Register of Historic Places in 1986.

References

Houses on the National Register of Historic Places in New York (state)
Greek Revival houses in New York (state)
Houses completed in 1840
Houses in Madison County, New York
National Register of Historic Places in Madison County, New York